As the Earth Turns may refer to:

As the Earth Turns, the 1933 debut novel by Gladys Hasty Carroll
As the Earth Turns (1934 film), an adaptation of the Carroll novel
As the Earth Turns (1938 film), an American science-fiction silent film directed by Richard Lyford

See also
As the World Turns (disambiguation)